Figanières is a commune in the Var department in the Provence-Alpes-Côte d'Azur region in Southeastern France. In 2019, it had a population of 2,623. Figanières is located just northeast of Draguignan.

See also
Communes of the Var department

References

Communes of Var (department)